

The governor of the Western Province of Sri Lanka ( Basnāhira palāth āndukāravarayā), is responsible for the management of the Western Provincial Council. Some of the office's key functions include exercising powers vested in the governor by the Provincial Council Act No. 42 of 1987 amended by Act No. 28 of 1990 and the 13th Amendment to the Constitution.

Governors

 (5)
 (2)
 (3)
 (1)

See also
 Chief Ministers of Sri Lanka

References

External links
Office of the Governor
Western Provincial Council

Western